Varvarovka is a rural locality (a selo) and the administrative center of Varvarovskoye Rural Settlement, Alexeyevsky District, Belgorod Oblast, Russia. The population was 665 as of 2010. There are 6 streets.

Geography 
Varvarovka is located 35 km southeast of Alexeyevka (the district's administrative centre) by road. Krasnoye is the nearest rural locality.

References 

Rural localities in Alexeyevsky District, Belgorod Oblast
Biryuchensky Uyezd